Taylor Swift is the debut studio album by American singer-songwriter Taylor Swift. It was released by Big Machine Records on October 24, 2006, in the United States and Canada, and March 18, 2008, internationally. Swift had signed with Sony/ATV Tree publishing house in 2004, at age 14, to pursue a career as a country musician. Her contract with Big Machine in 2005 enabled her to work on the album during her first high school year.

Swift wrote or co-wrote 11 of the album's tracks, including three by herself; Robert Ellis Orrall, Brian Maher, Angelo Petraglia, and Liz Rose have co-writing credits. Drawing on her personal life, the songs reflect Swift's outlook on life as a teenager, dealing with romantic relationships, friendships, and insecurity. Produced by Orrall and Nathan Chapman, Taylor Swift is a country record with pop and pop rock elements, incorporating acoustic instruments such as guitars, banjos, and fiddles.

Five singles supported Taylor Swift, including the Hot Country Songs number-ones "Our Song" and "Should've Said No", and Swift's first top-15 entry on the Billboard Hot 100, "Teardrops on My Guitar". Swift promoted the album through social network Myspace, which journalists found atypical for a country musician's marketing strategy. She embarked on a six-month radio tour in 2006, and opened tours for other country artists throughout 2006 and 2007. Critics praised the album's mainstream sensibility and Swift's songwriting at a young age for earnestly depicting adolescent sentiments. Taylor Swift was nominated for Album of the Year at the 2008 Academy of Country Music Awards and helped Swift earn accolades including a Grammy nomination for Best New Artist.

The album spent 24 weeks at number one on Top Country Albums and peaked at number five on the Billboard 200, becoming the longest-charting album of the 2000s decade. Certified seven times Platinum by the Recording Industry Association of America (RIAA), it made Swift the first solo female country artist to write or co-write every song on a platinum debut album. Journalists attributed Taylor Swift success to Swift's online marketing via Myspace, which ushered in a younger demographic in country audiences who had mainly consisted of middle-aged listeners. The album's crossover appeal shaped the country pop style of Swift's next two albums, and its autobiographical narratives about love and heartbreak inspired a subsequent generation of singer-songwriters.

Background 
Taylor Swift developed an early interest in the performing arts. After watching a documentary about country singer Faith Hill, Swift felt sure she needed to move to Nashville, Tennessee—widely regarded as the home of country music—to pursue a career as a country singer. At age eleven, Swift traveled to Nashville with her mother to pitch demo tapes of karaoke covers to record labels for a contract. She was rejected because record labels believed country music's middle-aged demographic would not listen to music by a teenage girl, which Swift firmly disbelieved.

Returning to her home town in Pennsylvania, Swift realized she had to distinguish herself from other aspiring country singers. To this end, at age 12, she started writing songs herself, and learned to play the guitar with the help of a computer repairman who had fixed her family's computer on one occasion. Swift's love for country music alienated her from her peers. Her performance of "The Star-Spangled Banner" at the 2003 US Open caught the attention of music manager Dan Dymtrow, who helped 13-year-old Swift get an artist development deal with RCA Records in Nashville. To assist Swift's artistic endeavors, her father transferred his job to Nashville, and her family relocated to Hendersonville, a city close to Nashville, in 2004.

Development and production 
Among Swift's inspirations were 1990s female country musicians—Shania Twain, the Chicks, Faith Hill, and LeAnn Rimes. She signed with the Sony/ATV Tree publishing house at age 14 to become a professional songwriter, the youngest signee in its history. After the signing, Swift commuted from Hendersonville to Nashville every afternoon to practice with experienced Music Row songwriters. Liz Rose became an important collaborator and formed a lasting working relationship with Swift in her future career. Swift had productive sessions with Rose because she respected Swift's vision and did not want to put her in the "Nashville cookie-cutter songwriting mold". Rose spoke highly of Swift's songwriting abilities: "Basically, I was just her editor...She had such a clear vision of what she was trying to say. And she'd come in with the most incredible hooks."

After one year on RCA's development deal, Swift was held off an official record deal; she felt the label was not confident in her self-written material. Swift parted ways with RCA: "I figured if they didn't believe in me then, they weren't ever going to believe in me." She recalled in 2009 in The Daily Telegraph: "I genuinely felt that I was running out of time. I wanted to capture these years of my life on an album while they still represented what I was going through." At an industry showcase at Nashville's Bluebird Café in 2005, Swift caught the attention of Scott Borchetta, a DreamWorks Records executive who was preparing to form an independent record label, Big Machine Records. She had first met Borchetta in 2004. Swift became one of Big Machine's first signings, and her father purchased a three-percent stake in the company.

Of the standard edition's eleven songs, Swift is the sole writer of three, and a co-writer of eight. Rose shares the writing credit on seven. Robert Ellis Orrall and Angelo Petraglia co-wrote "A Place in This World", and Brian Maher co-wrote "Mary's Song (Oh My My My)". After experimenting with different producers, Swift persuaded Big Machine to recruit Nathan Chapman, who had produced her demo album in a "little shed" behind the Sony/ATV offices. Big Machine was skeptical about hiring Chapman because he had never produced a commercially released studio album, but ultimately agreed because Swift felt they had the "right chemistry". Before approaching Chapman, Swift conceptualized how her songs should sound: "I know exactly where I want the hook to be and ... what instruments I want to use." Chapman was confident in Swift's abilities, saying that she "knows what she wants to say with her music". He has sole production credits on all songs but one, "The Outside", on which he is credited as an additional producer, and Orrall as the main producer. Recording took place during a four-month period near the end of 2005. When the recording and production wrapped, Swift had finished her first high school year.

Composition

Lyrics 
Swift wrote Taylor Swift from her personal life experiences as a teenager. While she adhered to the confessional songwriting associated with country music, she did not write about stereotypical themes such as "tractors and hay bales because that's not really the way I grew up". She instead wrote about her observations and reflections on matters from romantic relationships to friendships, striving to convey her teenage perspectives as honestly and personally as possible. Because her inspirations came from immediate feelings and emotions, Swift wrote songs anytime and anywhere, from studio sessions to school breaks. The result is straightforward lyrics, which The Daily Telegraph noted to be "brimmed with an earnest naiveté".

The songs on Taylor Swift are from the perspectives of a girl in an American small town, within the extends from high school hallways to rural backroads; Billboard noted that Swift's personal thoughts within a small confinement fosters a contemplative nature. Most songs on the album are about romantic relationships, some of which were based on Swift's observations rather than real experiences. The lead single and first track, "Tim McGraw", was inspired by Swift's relationship with a senior boyfriend during her first year of high school. The song is about Swift's hope that the boyfriend, after ending the relationship and leaving for college, would reminisce about her every time he hears their mutual favorite Tim McGraw song; according to Swift, "Tim McGraw" was inspired by McGraw's 2004 song "Can't Tell Me Nothin' ". Swift wrote "Our Song" for her high school talent show. She talked about the inspiration: "I wrote it about this guy I was dating, and how we didn't have a song. So I went ahead and wrote us one."

The songs "Picture to Burn" and "Should've Said No" depict a vengeful attitude toward those who do not reciprocate the protagonist's feelings; on "Picture to Burn", Swift sings about burning photographic evidence of an ex-boyfriend's existence. The original version included the lyrics, "Go and tell your friends that I'm obsessive and crazy / That's fine; I'll tell mine you're gay." On the radio edit and subsequent versions, Swift modified the lyric to "That's fine; You won't mind if I say." Heartbreak is another aspect Swift explored—"Teardrops on My Guitar" was about her experience with a classmate whom she had feelings for, but this classmate was in love with someone else. On "Cold as You", Swift laments a fruitless relationship: "I've never been anywhere cold as you." She said it was her favorite song lyrically on the album: "I love a line in a song where afterward you're just like... burn."

On other songs, Swift sings about insecurity and self-consciousness. "The Outside", which Swift wrote at age 12, describes the loneliness she felt when her love of country music alienated her from her peers. In a similar sentiment, "A Place in This World" expresses Swift's uncertainty about where she truly belongs. Swift wrote "Tied Together with a Smile" the day she learned one of her best friends had an eating disorder. The lyrics describe a girl hiding her inner turbulence; Swift commented, "I always thought that one of the biggest overlooked problems American girls face is insecurity."

Music 

Musically, Taylor Swift incorporates country music elements, including twang vocal delivery and acoustic instruments such as fiddles, guitars, and banjos. According to American Songwriter's Michael Kosser, Chapman's production was a distinctive sound hard to categorize into a particular genre; Big Machine marketed the album to country radio regardless. Reviews from The Palm Beach Post and the Chicago Tribune categorized Taylor Swift as country music.

Elements of crossover pop are apparent on many songs. In retrospective articles, critics disagreed on to what extent the Taylor Swift songs are fully country. Jon Caramanica from The New York Times called it a "pop-minded country" album, while Rolling Stone critic Chuck Eddy observed that Taylor Swift blended "pop-rock and Dixie Chicks-style twang". Another album review on Rolling Stone, meanwhile, felt the songs were inflected with rock. Grady Smith from the same magazine listed the singles "Tim McGraw", "Teardrops on My Guitar", "Our Song", and "Picture to Burn" among Swift's "countriest songs", which evoke "classic country" in terms of instrumentation, themes, and song structure. J. Freedom du Lac from The Washington Post noted that the "rhythmic, rap-influenced phrasing" on "Our Song" was atypical to country music.

James E. Perone, an academic in music, cited "Tim McGraw" as an example of Swift's crossover appeal. "Tim McGraw" follows the I-vi-IV-V chord progression, which is typically found in late-1950s and early-1960s rock and roll. The refrain consists of repeated motives built within a small pitch range, which gives the song a catchy tune. Additionally, the refrain—and to a lesser degree, the verses—makes heavy use of syncopation at the sixteenth-note level, which brings about a production reminiscent to non-country genres such as alternative rock and hip hop. Perone argued that these melodic qualities laid the groundwork to Swift's pop radio-friendly discography enjoyed by both pop and country audiences.

Release and promotion 

Taylor Swift was released on October 24, 2006, through Big Machine Records. Swift was involved in the album packaging, designing doodle graphics herself. She included hidden messages with hints at the subjects of her songs in the lyrics printed in the liner notes, inspired by the Beatles' hiding secret messages in their records. She executed the same technique on her subsequent albums. Swift said the messages could be interpreted by tracking the capital letters in the order they appear in the lyrics printed in the liner notes. In addition to the eleven-track standard edition, a 15-track deluxe edition contains three new original songs—"I'm Only Me When I'm with You", "Invisible", and "A Perfectly Good Heart", and an alternate version of "Teardrops on My Guitar". An "enhanced version", which includes the music videos for "Teardrops on My Guitar" and "Tim McGraw", was released on March 18, 2008.

The album was preceded by the lead single "Tim McGraw", which was released on June 19, 2006. The single peaked at number 40 on the Billboard Hot 100 and number six on the Hot Country Songs chart, marking Swift's debut appearance on both charts. It was certified double platinum by the Recording Industry Association of America (RIAA). Swift promoted the album performing on televised programs including Good Morning America, The Megan Mullally Show, America's Got Talent, Total Request Live, the CMT Music Awards, and the Academy of Country Music Awards. To maintain her presence on country radio, Swift embarked on a radio tour during a six-month run in 2006. Swift also promoted the album by performing as an opening act for other country artists' concert tours. She opened for Rascal Flatts from October 19 to November 3, 2006. Throughout 2007, she opened for George Strait, Brad Paisley, and Tim McGraw and Faith Hill's joint tour, Soul2Soul II Tour.

In addition to traditional radio promotion, Swift extensively used her Myspace profile to communicate with her audiences, sharing her daily blogs and song information. Her online marketing strategy boosted the album's popularity among teenagers and young adults. Swift and Big Machine decided to release "Our Song" as a single because of the positive feedback it received on Myspace. Throughout 2007 and 2008, four more singles supported Taylor Swift: "Teardrops on My Guitar", "Our Song", "Picture to Burn", and "Should've Said No", all of which peaked within the top forty of the Hot 100 and the top ten of the Hot Country Songs chart. "Teardrops on My Guitar" peaked at number two on the Hot Country Songs chart and had a crossover release to pop radio; it peaked at number seven on the Mainstream Top 40 (Pop Songs) chart, and number 13 on the Hot 100. "Our Song" and "Should've Said No" reached number one on the Hot Country Songs chart. With "Our Song", Swift became the youngest person to single-handedly write and sing a Hot Country Songs number one. All singles were certified platinum or more by the RIAA, with "Teardrops on My Guitar" (3× Platinum) and "Our Song" (4× Platinum) selling over three million copies each.

From August 2019 to January 2020 Big Machine released 4,000 copies of each of the singles from Taylor Swift on vinyl for the 13th anniversary of the album. This was met with immediate backlash in light of the purchase of the masters of Taylor Swift's first six studio albums.

Critical reception 

Taylor Swift received generally positive reviews from critics. Though some deemed the lyrical themes unsophisticated and lacking depth, most critics praised Swift's songwriting for using familiar techniques in ways that sounded original and novel. On Metacritic, which assigns an aggregated score out of 100 to reviews from publications, the album earned a score of 67, based on five reviews.

In a review for Country Weekly, Chris Neal deemed Swift a success compared to previous aspiring teenage country singers because of her "honesty, intelligence and idealism". Reviewers were impressed by Swift's maturity while retaining a sense of youthful innocence in her lyrics, including Ken Rosenbaum of The Toledo Blade, Nick Cristiano of The Philadelphia Inquirer, Jeff Tamarkin of AllMusic, and Rolling Stone. In a review for The Palm Beach Post, James Fontaine felt Swift's honest depiction of her teenage experience made the album compelling, and lauded the "musical maturity" for effectively communicating the sentiments. The Morning Call Keith Groller said that the album was not groundbreaking but could appeal to a wide-ranging audience with its adolescent earnestness.

Critics commented on the album's pop sensibility—Neal and Rolling Stone found it appealing to a mainstream audience. Tamarkin commented that Swift's "considerably strong voice" straddled the precarious boundary between country and pop, and criticized producer Chapman for applying "a gloss that not all [songs] really require". In the Chicago Tribune, Chrissie Dickinson described Taylor Swift as  "a slick package, pleasant enough but devoid of anything resembling gritty traction". In a mixed review for PopMatters, Roger Holland complimented the production quality of certain tracks, but deemed the album overall a misstep for Swift's true appeal: "It's to be hoped that when she finds both her place and her full grown voice, she's able to find an accommodation between the country tradition and her very obvious pop sensibilities." Robert Christgau rated the album a "cut" score, and selected "Tim McGraw" and "Picture to Burn" as highlights.

Taylor Swift helped Swift earned a nomination for New Female Vocalist of the Year at the 2007 Academy of Country Music Awards, a Horizon Award at the 2007 Country Music Association Awards, and a nomination for the Grammy Award for Best New Artist at the 50th Annual Grammy Awards (2008). The album itself was nominated for Album of the Year at the 2008 Academy of Country Music Awards.

Retrospective reviews have remained favorable toward Swift's early songwriting. Maura Johnston from Pitchfork described the album as an honest record about teenage perspectives, which set Swift apart from the manufactured albums that "weighed down former teen sensations". Jonathan Bradley from Billboard lauded how Swift captured immediate emotions and feelings with "details... so sharp at so small a scale". In July 2022, Rolling Stone ranked Taylor Swift at number 32 on its list of the "100 Best Debut Albums of All Time".

Commercial performance 
Taylor Swift was a sleeper success in the United States. It debuted at number 19 on the Billboard 200 chart dated November 11, 2006, with first-week sales of 40,000 copies. Because albums often drop in sales after their initial release, Swift did not expect her album to remain long on the chart: "I would be incredibly lucky to see this album certified Gold." Contrary to her expectations, Taylor Swift kept selling at a fairly consistent pace. By November 2007, the album had sold over a million copies. It reached its highest sales week on the Billboard 200 chart dated January 5, 2008, when it sold 187,000 copies and charted at number eight.

The album reached its peak at number five on the chart dated January 19, 2008, in its 63rd week of charting. Spending 157 weeks on the Billboard 200 by October 2009, Taylor Swift marked the longest stay on the chart by any album released in the 2000s decade. It had spent a total of 275 weeks on the chart by November 2014. On Top Country Albums, Taylor Swift peaked at number one for 24 non-consecutive weeks. By October 2020, the album had sold 5.75 million pure copies in the United States. It was certified seven times Platinum by the Recording Industry Association of America (RIAA) for earning over seven million album-equivalent units in the nation.

In Canada, Taylor Swift peaked at number 14 on the Canadian Albums Chart and was certified Platinum by Music Canada (MC). The album peaked at number 33 on the Australian Albums Chart in March 2010, and was certified Platinum by the Australian Recording Industry Association (ARIA). In the United Kingdom, it peaked at number 81 on the Albums Chart and was certified Gold by the British Phonographic Industry (BPI) for sales of more than 100,000 copies. The album had sold 198,000 copies in the United Kingdom by October 2022. It appeared on albums charts in New Zealand (peaking at number 38), Japan (53), Ireland (59) and Scotland (71).

Impact and legacy 

Taylor Swift was released in a time when female country artists were gaining momentum in popularity. Nashville industry experts nonetheless disapproved of Swift's debut as a teenager because they considered the album's adolescent themes inappropriate for country music's middle-aged key demographic. Jim Malec of American Songwriter observed that contrary to industry expectations,Taylor Swifts success on country radio, particularly with the track "Our Song", established Swift as one of the few teenage female artists to be equally successful with male counterparts in a format dominated by men.

Though critics questioned the album's country-music categorization, Rolling Stone remarked that following the Dixie Chicks' 2003 controversy, which left "a huge space opened up in the heart of the country audience", Swift "has completely filled it ... with a sound that's not just rock-informed but teen-poppy too". Jon Caramanica of The New York Times observed that, although the country-pop crossover sound was facilitated by previous successful singers, Swift was the first country artist to embrace the status of a pop star. Taylor Swift made her the first female solo artist in country music to write or co-write every song on a platinum-certified debut album. Its production laid the groundwork to Swift's subsequent country-pop discography, whose chart success straddled the perceived boundary between the two genres.

Music journalists attributed the album's success to Swift's songwriting and online marketing strategy. While online promotion was familiar to pop and hip hop artists, she was the first country artist to promote her songs on social media services like Myspace; she also relied on social media to promote her subsequent releases, which brought her a loyal fan base. Her social media presence ushered in a younger audience consisted of mostly teenage girls who listened to country music—a previously unheard demographic. The autobiographical narratives on Taylor Swift defined Swift's songwriting over the next decade, which Billboard noted to inspire a new generation of aspiring singer-songwriters. Consequence stated Taylor Swift was the blueprint for songs focused on unrequited love and suffering, paving the way for "future teenie boppers" such as Conan Gray's "Heather" (2020) and Olivia Rodrigo's "Drivers License" (2021). Rolling Stone opined, "if Taylor Swift retired right after dropping her debut album, she'd still be remembered as a legend today [...] Taylor debuted with complete mastery of a genre she was also completely transforming." According to Entertainment Weekly, the commercial success of her debut helped the infant Big Machine go on to sign Garth Brooks and Jewel.

Track listing 
Except where noted, all tracks were written by Taylor Swift and Liz Rose and produced by Nathan Chapman.

Notes

Personnel 
Credits adapted from the album's liner notes

 Taylor Swift – lead vocals, background vocals, songwriting, acoustic guitar
 Nathan Chapman – acoustic guitar, banjo, bass, drums, electric guitar, engineer, background vocals, mandolin, production
 Scott Borchetta – executive producer
 Chuck Ainlay – mixing
 Jeff Balding – mixing
 Bruce Bouton – dobro
 Mike Brignardello – bass guitar
 Nick Buda – drums
 Gary Brunette – electric guitar
 Jason Campbell – production coordination
 Chason Carlson – engineer
 Aaron Chmielewski – assistant engineer
 Eric Darken – percussion
 Allen Ditto – engineer
 Dan Dugmore – pedal steel
 Shannon Forrest – drums
 Rob Hajacos – fiddle
 Gordon Hammon – assistant engineer
 Tony Harrell – keyboard
 Jeffrey Hyde – banjo
 Scott Kidd – mixing assistant
 Greg Lawrence – mixing assistant
 Andy Leftwich – fiddle, mandolin
 Liana Manis – background vocals
 Tim Marks – bass
 Robert Ellis Orrall – background vocals, producer
 Lex Price – mandolin
 Lee Ann Ramey – graphic design
 Joshua Whitmore – dobro, pedal steel
 Clarke Schleicher – engineer
 Steve Short – assistant engineer
 Sandi Spika – engineer
 Whitney Sutton – production coordination
 Ilya Toshinsky – acoustic guitar, banjo
 Wanda Vick – fiddle
 Hank Williams – mastering
 John Willis – banjo, mandolin, hi string acoustic guitar

Charts

Weekly charts 
Taylor Swift reached its peak position in various countries at different points of its chart runs.

Year-end charts

Decade-end charts

All-time charts

Certifications and sales

Release history

Footnotes

References

Citations

Cited sources

External links 

2006 debut albums
Big Machine Records albums
Taylor Swift albums
Albums produced by Nathan Chapman (record producer)
Country albums by American artists
Albums produced by Robert Ellis Orrall
Albums produced by Angelo Petraglia